Acanthurus bariene is a tropical fish also commonly known as the bariene surgeonfish, black-spot surgeonfish, or eye-spot surgeonfish. It was first named by René Primevère Lesson in 1831.

References

External links
 

Acanthurus
Fish of Palau
Fish described in 1831
Taxa named by René Lesson